The Caproni Ca.350 was an Italian single-engined project for a two-seat fighter-bomber/reconnaissance aircraft of the 1930s. Designed by Cesare Pallavicino to meet a requirement of the Regia Aeronautica, it was an innovative and fast design, to have been powered by an Isotta Fraschini Zeta R.C.42, but no aircraft were built.

Specifications

See also

References

Further reading

External links
 https://web.archive.org/web/20120324033704/http://www.luciano.tamietto.name/planes/italian.htm
 https://web.archive.org/web/20110726191037/http://www.collectionstrust.org.uk/aircraft/599.htm
 https://web.archive.org/web/20110605030638/http://italianaircraftofwwii.devhub.com/
 http://www.elgrancapitan.org/foro/viewtopic.php?f=52&t=17635
 http://it.narkive.com/2005/11/24/3661271-motori-isotta-fraschini.html

Ca.335
1930s Italian military reconnaissance aircraft
1930s Italian fighter aircraft
S.47
Abandoned military aircraft projects of Italy

it:SABCA S 47